Zaim is a representation of the male Arabic given name Za'im, meaning leader, chief. Correspondingly al-Za'im means "the leader". 

 Zaim (name)
 Zaim, Căuşeni, a commune in Căuşeni district, Moldova
 Zaim, Khyber Pakhtunkhwa, a town in Khyber Pakhtunkhwa, Pakistan

See also
 Zaimoğlu